Pasumpon Forward Bloc was a political party in Tamil Nadu, India. The party was founded in 1980 by Ayyanan Ambalam, following a split from the National Forward Bloc (NFB). In 1981, NFB and PFB merged and formed the Tamil Nadu Forward Bloc.

The party name referred to the late Forward Bloc leader Pasumpon Muthuramalinga Thevar.

Sources
Bose, K., Forward Bloc, Madras: Tamil Nadu Academy of Political Science, 1988.

Defunct political parties in Tamil Nadu
1980 establishments in Tamil Nadu
Political parties established in 1980
1981 disestablishments in India
Political parties disestablished in 1981
All India Forward Bloc